UNESCO Champions for Sport are international celebrity sport personalities advocates for the United Nations agency UNESCO. This family of world-class athletes purveys UNESCO's message the world over. As well, they reflect UNESCO's concerns to promote the values of physical education and sports with a view of building a better future for younger generations.

Current list
Currently, twelve personalities are designated UNESCO Champion for Sport:

See also
UNESCO Goodwill Ambassador
UNESCO Special Envoy
UNESCO Artist for Peace

References

UNESCO
Goodwill ambassador programmes